R&BA is the fifth and final studio album by Scottish musician BA Robertson, released in June 1982 by Asylum Records. Unlike his previous two albums, it failed to chart, despite the success of some of its singles. The album was reissued on CD on 12 May 2017 by Cherry Red Records which included several bonus tracks.

Release and reception 
There were four singles released from the album. "Hold Me" is a cover of the song from 1933 and is a duet with Maggie Bell which peaked at number 11 on the UK Singles Chart. "Ready or Not" peaked at number 82 in the UK and is with the Memphis Horns. The single releases of "Hold Me" and "Ready or Not" credited Bell and The Memphis Horns on their front covers, yet they were only credited in the album's credits.

Ian Cantry of Louder than War said the album "treads very much a blues/soul path, with mixed results" and that "apart from ["Hold Me"] nothing much stands out – solid performances but few thrills". A notable cameo appearance on the album is Cliff Richard who provides backing vocals on "Son of a Gunn" which was co-written by Rick Parfitt of Status Quo.

After the release of this album, Robertson went on to write "We Have a Dream" for Scotland for the 1982 World Cup. A live version of this song by Robertson at the Edinburgh Fringe Festival is included as a bonus track of the expanded edition of the album.

Other bonus tracks included are a demo version of the theme tune to the television series Saturday Superstore, a piano demo version of "Legislate for Love" with John Barlow Jarvis, and a German version of his biggest hit "Bang Bang", which is humorously retitled "Bäng Bäng".

Track listing 

2017 bonus tracks:

Personnel 
Musicians

 BA Robertson – vocals, strings
 Alan Gorrie – bass guitar, guitar (track 3), co-producer of rhythm tracks
 Graham Jarvis – drums
 Billy Bremner – guitar
 Billy Livsey – keyboards, melodica (track 10)
 The Memphis Horns:
 Andrew Love – tenor and alto saxophones
 Ben Cauley – trumpet
 Jack Hale – trombone
 Gary Topper – baritone saxophone
 Vaneese Thomas, Deborah Carter, Val Young, William C Brown – backing vocals
 Louise and Eunice – extra harmonies (track 1), backing vocals (track 2)
 Cliff Richard – all harmony vocals (track 8)
 Maggie Bell – vocals (track 6)
 Paul Jones – harmonica (track 6)
 Jim Mullen – bass guitar (track 3), guitar (tracks 5 and 9)
 Adrian Wyatt – extra guitars (tracks 2, 4, 8 and 11)
 Luís Jardim – percussion (track 11)
 Jeff Daly, Howie Casey – saxophones (track 6)

Technical

 John Hudson, Brian Tench – engineers at Mayfair Studios
 Bob Parr – assistant engineer at Mayfair Studios
 William C Brown, Robert Jackson – engineers for recording of horns and backing vocals at Ardent Studios
 Carl Marsh – horns arrangement at Ardent Studios
 Geoffrey Calver – engineer for recording of strings at Marcus Studios
 Mike McNaught – strings arrangement
 Sue Proudlove – art direction
 Niall Doull-Connolly – photography

References 

1982 albums
BA Robertson albums
Asylum Records albums